San Miguel (Spanish for "St. Michael") is a village and census-designated place (CDP) in San Luis Obispo County, California. As of the 2010 census, the population was 2,336. San Miguel was founded by the Spanish in 1797, when Mission San Miguel Arcángel was established by Fermín de Lasuén. San Miguel is a tourist destination with historic architecture and vineyards, as part of the Paso Robles wine region.

History

The area of San Miguel and the rest of the southern Salinas Valley was inhabited by the Salinans, an Indigenous Californian nation.

The Spanish founded the settlement at San Miguel on 25 July 1797, when Fermín de Lasuén established Mission San Miguel Arcángel, under the authority of the Franciscan Order. The site of the mission was specifically chosen due to its proximity to the large number of Salinan villages in the area. The interior of the mission church features murals executed under the direction of the famed artist Esteban Munrás in the 1820s.

The mission's location between Mission San Luis Obispo and Mission San Antonio de Padua provided a stop on the trip that had previously taken two days. In 1803, the mission reported an Indian population of 908, while its lands grazed 809 cattle, 3,223 sheep, 342 horses and 29 mules. That year's harvest included about 2,186 fanegas of wheat and corn (A fanega was about ). Most of the mission burned, while still being developed, in 1806. It was rebuilt within a year.

The Rios-Caledonia Adobe was built in 1835 just south of Mission San Miguel as a home for the overseer of mission lands. 

On July 15, 1836, following the Mexican secularization of the missions, Mission San Miguel Arcángel was acquired by Ygnacio Coronel, a noted Californio ranchero and politician.

In 1846, Governor Pío Pico sold Mission San Miguel Arcángel for $600 to Petronilo Ríos and William Reed. Reed used the Mission as a family residence and a store. In 1848, Reed and his family were murdered, leaving the Mission vacant for a period of time. The Mission was a stopping place for miners coming from Los Angeles to San Francisco, and, consequently, was used as a saloon, dance hall, storeroom and living quarters.

In 1859, President James Buchanan returned the mission to the Catholic Church. In 1878, after 38 years without a resident priest, Padre Philip Farrelly became the first pastor of Mission San Miguel Arcángel since the secularization. In 1928, Mission San Miguel Arcángel and Mission San Antonio de Padua were both returned to the Franciscan Order, which led to their restorations and repairs.

The 2003 San Simeon earthquake caused severe damage to the sanctuary at Mission San Miguel. The Catholic Church considered closing the parish due to the extensive damage and the estimated $15 million cost of repair; however, the work has since been completed and the mission has since reopened.

In 2011, San Miguel's local business community formed the San Miguel Chamber of Commerce in order to promote the village's tourism and agricultural industries.

Geography
According to the United States Census Bureau, the CDP has a total area of 1.7 square miles (4.4 km), all of it land.

Demographics

2010
The 2010 United States Census reported that San Miguel had a population of 2,336. The racial makeup of San Miguel was 1,638 (70.1%) White, 65 (2.8%) African American, 58 (2.5%) Native American, 19 (0.8%) Asian, 1 (0.0%) Pacific Islander, 474 (20.3%) from other races, and 81 (3.5%) from two or more races. Hispanic or Latino of any race were 1,196 persons (51.2%).

The Census reported that 2,324 people (99.5% of the population) lived in households, 12 (0.5%) lived in non-institutionalized group quarters, and 0 (0%) were institutionalized.

There were 698 households, out of which 358 (51.3%) had children under the age of 18 living in them, 379 (54.3%) were opposite-sex married couples living together, 93 (13.3%) had a female householder with no husband present, 57 (8.2%) had a male householder with no wife present.  There were 73 (10.5%) unmarried opposite-sex partnerships, and 8 (1.1%) same-sex married couples or partnerships. 115 households (16.5%) were made up of individuals, and 25 (3.6%) had someone living alone who was 65 years of age or older. The average household size was 3.33.  There were 529 families (75.8% of all households); the average family size was 3.73.

The population was spread out, with 774 people (33.1%) under the age of 18, 262 people (11.2%) aged 18 to 24, 711 people (30.4%) aged 25 to 44, 481 people (20.6%) aged 45 to 64, and 108 people (4.6%) who were 65 years of age or older.  The median age was 28.3 years. For every 100 females, there were 103.8 males.  For every 100 females age 18 and over, there were 101.3 males.

The homeowner vacancy rate was 3.7%; the rental vacancy rate was 8.0%.  1,399 people (59.9% of the population) lived in owner-occupied housing units and 925 people (39.6%) lived in rental housing units.

2000

As of the census of 2000, there were 1,427 people, 468 households, and 335 families residing in the CDP. The racial makeup of the CDP was 63.28% White, 1.47% African American, 2.73% Native American, 0.42% Asian, 23.83% from other races, and 8.27% from two or more races. Hispanic or Latino of any race were 32.66% of the population.

There were 468 households, out of which 46.6% had children under the age of 18 living with them, 52.4% were married couples living together, 12.2% had a female householder with no husband present, and 28.4% were non-families. 20.1% of all households were made up of individuals, and 7.1% had someone living alone who was 65 years of age or older.  The average household size was 3.03 and the average family size was 3.53.

In the CDP, the population was spread out, with 33.0% under the age of 18, 11.0% from 18 to 24, 32.1% from 25 to 44, 17.6% from 45 to 64, and 6.3% who were 65 years of age or older.  The median age was 29 years. For every 100 females, there were 104.7 males.  For every 100 females age 18 and over, there were 108.3 males.

The median income for a household in the CDP was $33,264, and the median income for a family was $32,847. Males had a median income of $26,216 versus $20,134 for females. The per capita income for the CDP was $15,444.  About 6.1% of families and 10.2% of the population were below the poverty line, including 14.5% of those under age 18 and 14.0% of those age 65 or over.

Government

The local government organization is the San Miguel Community Services District (CSD).

References

External links

San Miguel Chamber of Commerce

Census-designated places in San Luis Obispo County, California
Spanish mission settlements in North America
Census-designated places in California